A Bernal sphere is a type of space habitat intended as a long-term home for permanent residents, first proposed in 1929 by John Desmond Bernal.

Bernal's original proposal described a hollow non-rotating spherical shell  in diameter, with a target population of 20,000 to 30,000 people. The Bernal sphere would be filled with air.

O'Neill versions

Island One
In a series of studies held at Stanford University in 1975 and 1976 with the purpose of speculating on designs for future space colonies, Dr. Gerard K. O'Neill proposed Island One, a modified Bernal sphere with a diameter of only  rotating at 1.9 RPM to produce a full Earth artificial gravity at the sphere's equator. The result would be an interior landscape that would resemble a large valley running all the way around the equator of the sphere. Island One would be capable of providing living and recreation space for a population of approximately 10,000 people, with a "Crystal Palace" habitat used for agriculture. Sunlight was to be provided to the interior of the sphere using external mirrors to direct it in through large windows near the poles. The form of a sphere was chosen for its optimum ability to contain air pressure and its optimum mass-efficiency at providing radiation shielding.

Island Two
O'Neill envisioned the next generation of space habitat as a larger version of Island One. Island Two would be approximately 1800 meters in diameter, yielding an equatorial circumference of nearly six and a half kilometers (four miles).  The size was driven by economics; the habitat was to be small enough to allow for efficient transportation within the habitat and large enough to support an efficient industrial base.

Image gallery

See also
 Dyson sphere
 Space habitat
 O'Neill cylinder aka Island III, the brother design to Island I
 Rotating wheel space station
 Bernal sphere in popular culture
 Stanford torus
 Space colonization

References

External links

 NASA SP-413: Space Settlements - A Design Study. 

Proposed space stations